The Lustrate Process is the sixth studio album by Swedish death metal band The Project Hate MCMXCIX. It was released in July 2009 on the Dutch label Vic Records.

Track listing

Personnel 
 Jörgen Sandström – vocals
 Jo Enckell – vocals
 Lord K. Philipson – guitars, bass, keyboards, programmings, serpents
 Anders Bertilsson – guitar
 Thomas Ohlsson – drums

Guest musicians 
 Mike Wead – solos
 Pär Fransson – solos
 Martin van Drunen – vocals
 Christian Älvestam – vocals
 Lars-Göran Petrov – vocals
 Johan Hegg – vocals
 Robert Eriksson – vocals

2009 albums
The Project Hate MCMXCIX albums